Frederik "Frits" Korthals Altes (born 15 May 1931) is a retired Dutch politician of the People's Party for Freedom and Democracy (VVD) and jurist. He was granted the honorary title of Minister of State on 26 October 2001.

Korthals Altes attended the Barlaeus Gymnasium in Amsterdam from June 1937 until July 1943 and applied at the Leiden University in June 1951 majoring in Law and obtaining a Bachelor of Laws degree in June 1953 before graduating with a Master of Laws degree in July 1957. Korthals Altes worked as a lawyer in Rotterdam from August 1957 until November 1982. Korthals Altes served as Chairman of the People's Party for Freedom and Democracy from 15 March 1975 until 22 May 1981. Korthals Altes was elected as a Member of the Senate after the Senate election of 1981, taking office on 10 June 1981. After the election of 1982 Korthals Altes was appointed as Minister of Justice in the Cabinet Lubbers I, taking office on 4 November 1982. Korthals Altes served as acting Minister of the Interior from 20 February 1986 until 12 March 1986 following the death of Koos Rietkerk. After the election of 1986 Korthals Altes continued as Minister of Justice in the Cabinet Lubbers II, taking office on 14 July 1986. Korthals Altes again served as acting Minister of the Interior from 26 January 1987 until 3 February 1987 during a medical leave of absence of Kees van Dijk until Minister of Social Affairs and Employment Jan de Koning took over as acting Minister of the Interior. Korthals Altes was elected as a Member of the House of Representatives after the election of 1986, taking office on 14 September 1989. The Cabinet Lubbers II was replaced by the Cabinet Lubbers III on 7 November 1989 and he continued to serve in the House of Representatives as a frontbencher. 

In April 1991 Korthals Altes announced that he wanted to return to the Senate. After the Senate election of 1991 Korthals Altes was elected again as a Member of the Senate, he resigned as a Member of the House of Representatives the day he was installed as a Member of the Senate, taking office on 11 June 1991 serving as a frontbencher chairing several parliamentary committees. Korthals Altes also became active in the private sector and public sector and occupied numerous seats as a corporate director and nonprofit director on several boards of directors and supervisory boards (Unilever, KPN, Randstad Holding, Arcadis, Carnegie Foundation, Stichting INGKA Foundation, and the Institute of International Relations Clingendael) and served on several state commissions and councils on behalf of the government. Following the Senate election of 1991 Korthals Altes was selected as Parliamentary leader of the People's Party for Freedom and Democracy in the Senate, taking office on 13 June 1995. Korthals Altes was nominated as President of the Senate following the appointed of Herman Tjeenk Willink as Vice-President of the Council of State, taking office on 11 March 1997. In September 2001 Korthals Altes announced his retirement from national politics. He resigned as President of the Senate and a Member of the Senate on 2 October 2001.

Biography

Early life
Frederik Korthals Altes was born on 15 May 1931 in Amsterdam. He worked as a lawyer from 1957 until 1982.

Politics
After the second Lubbers cabinet fell because of a parliamentary motion of no confidence by the VVD faction, new elections were called, and Korthals Altes was elected to the Dutch House of Representatives. In 1991, he was elected back again to the Dutch Senate, where he became a Chairman of the Senate in 1997. From 1990 to 1997, he was also practising law again, with the Dutch firm Nauta Dutilh.

With his resignation from the senate in 2001, he was nominated as Minister of State. Earlier in 1997, the VVD gave him an honorary membership.
From 1997 until 2001, he was President of the Senate.
The Dutch Queen nominated Korthals Altes, alongside Rein Jan Hoekstra (CDA), as informateur, after a first round of talks between the CDA and Labour Party (PvdA) to form a new cabinet failed. The second Balkenende cabinet between the VVD, CDA and D66, was installed in May 2003.

Korthals Altes chaired a commission in 2007 that looked into the Dutch election process. The final report of the commission advised the government to abandon electronic voting machines, as they lack a paper trail.

Decorations

References

External links

Official
  Mr. F. (Frits) Korthals Altes Parlement & Politiek
  Mr. F. Korthals Altes (VVD) Eerste Kamer der Staten-Generaal

1931 births
Living people
Chairmen of the People's Party for Freedom and Democracy
Commanders of the Order of Orange-Nassau
Dutch autobiographers
Dutch corporate directors
Dutch magazine editors
Dutch memoirists
Dutch nonprofit directors
Grand Cross of the Ordre national du Mérite
Grand Crosses 1st class of the Order of Merit of the Federal Republic of Germany
Grand Crosses of the Order of Merit (Portugal)
Grand Crosses of the Order of the Crown (Belgium)
Grand Officiers of the Légion d'honneur
Knights Grand Cross of the Order of Isabella the Catholic
Leiden University alumni
Members of the House of Representatives (Netherlands)
Members of the Senate (Netherlands)
Ministers of Justice of the Netherlands
Ministers of the Interior of the Netherlands
Ministers of State (Netherlands)
Politicians from Amsterdam
Lawyers from Rotterdam
People's Party for Freedom and Democracy politicians
Presidents of the Senate (Netherlands)
Recipients of the Order of the Sacred Treasure, 1st class
20th-century Dutch lawyers
20th-century Dutch male writers
20th-century Dutch politicians
21st-century Dutch businesspeople
21st-century Dutch male writers
21st-century Dutch politicians